Ian Brossat (born 23 April 1980) is a French politician. Since 2008, he has been a member of the Paris Council, representing the 18th arrondissement, elected as a Communist.  He stood for election to the National Assembly in 2012, losing to Daniel Vaillant.

Ian Brossat is the son of Alain Brossat, a philosopher and professor at University of Paris VIII, and Swedish-born Sylvia Klingberg. Brossat's grandfather Marcus Klingberg was a Polish-born Israeli epidemiologist, who was convicted of spying for the Soviet Union. His maternal grandmother, Adjia Eisman (also known as Wanda Yashinskaya), was a survivor of the Warsaw Ghetto. Ian Brossat is gay; he married his husband Brice in 2013.

Brossat graduated from the École normale supérieure de Lyon.

References

1980 births
Councillors of Paris
ENS Fontenay-Saint-Cloud-Lyon alumni
French Communist Party politicians
21st-century French Jews
French people of Israeli descent
French people of Polish-Jewish descent
French people of Swedish descent
Gay politicians
Jewish socialists
Living people
Lycée Henri-IV alumni
LGBT Jews
French LGBT politicians
French LGBT rights activists
Politicians from Paris
Politicians of the French Fifth Republic
Candidates for the 2017 French legislative election